General elections were held in Kenya Colony between 26 March and 2 April 1938. Three of the eleven white seats in the Legislative Council were uncontested, whilst all Indian seats were contested, and saw more businessmen were elected than politicians. Lady Sidney Farrar became the country's first female Legislative Council member after defeating Conway Harvey in the Nyanza constituency by two votes.

Results

References

1938 elections in Africa
1938 in Kenya
1938
Legislative Council of Kenya
1938
March 1938 events
April 1938 events